015B is a South Korean music duo that debuted in 1990 and went on to become one of the country's most popular acts of the early 1990s. The group name which means literally "A crow flies across the sky" and it consists of brothers Jeong Seok-won and Jang Ho-il, is known for its "guest singer system," and has never had a permanent lead vocalist. The group has experimented with many music genres including pop ballads, electronica, and hip hop.

Discography

Studio albums

Compilation albums

Extended plays

Awards and nominations

References 

Musical groups established in 1990
K-pop music groups
South Korean hip hop groups
South Korean electronic music groups
1990 establishments in South Korea